These are the official results of the Men's triple jump event at the 1997 IAAF World Championships in Athens, Greece. There were a total number of 40 participating athletes, with two qualifying groups and the final held on Friday 1997-08-08.

With the previous two major championships resulting in 18 metre jumps, expectations were high.  All medalists from those championships made it into the finals.  In addition to world record holder Jonathan Edwards and Olympic champion Kenny Harrison, there were three more athletes who had jumped beyond 17.70m

Edwards was the first to get over 17m in the first round with a 17.33m. Near the end of the round, Yoelbi Quesada took the lead with a 17.60m and his Cuban teammate Aliecer Urrutia followed up with a 17.23m. After two round, Harrison only had a 17.05 to his credit, more than a metre less than his winning jump in Atlanta. Just before his final preliminary attempt he saw Christos Meletoglou put out a 17.12 to move into the eighth qualifying position, but next on the runway, Harrison could only make 17.04m and wouldn't be a player in the medals.

In the fourth round, Edwards' 17.66m put him back into second place.  On his final attempt he improved to 17.69m but couldn't overtake Quesada.

Qualifying round
Held on Wednesday 1997-08-06 with the mark set on 17.00 metres (8+4 athletes)

Final

See also
 1996 Men's Olympic triple jump

References
 Results

T
Triple jump at the World Athletics Championships